Calliostoma funiculare is a species of sea snail, a marine gastropod mollusk in the family Calliostomatidae.

Some authors place this taxon in the subgenus Calliostoma (Fautor)

Description

Distribution
This species occurs in the Persian Gulf.

References

 Marshall, B.A. (1995). Calliostomatidae (Gastropoda: Trochoidea) from New Caledonia, the Loyalty Islands and the northern Lord Howe Rise . pp. 381-458 in Bouchet, P. (ed.). Résultats des Campagnes MUSORSTOM, Vol. 14 . Mém. Mus. natn. Hist. nat. 167 : 381-458

External links

funiculare
Gastropods described in 1906